Onosma stridii is a perennial flowering plant in the family Boraginaceae. It is a Greek endemic species found only at Mt. Kallidromo and Mt. Chlomo. It was named after Swede botanist Arne Strid.

stridii